In April 2018, the United Nations General Assembly declared June 3 as International World Bicycle Day. The resolution for World Bicycle Day recognizes "the uniqueness, longevity and versatility of the bicycle, which has been in use for two centuries, and that it is a simple, affordable, reliable, clean and environmentally fit sustainable means of transport."

Founding 
Professor Leszek Sibilski (who is a Polish social scientist working in the United States) led a grassroots campaign with his sociology class to promote a UN Resolution for World Bicycle Day, eventually gaining the support of Turkmenistan and 56 other countries. The original UN Blue and White #June3WorldBicycleDay logo was designed by Isaac Feld and the accompanying animation was done by Professor John E. Swanson. It depicts bicyclists of various types riding around the globe. At the bottom of the logo is the hashtag #June3WorldBicycleDay. The main message is to show that the bicycle belongs to and serves all of humanity.

Significance 
World Bicycle Day is a special day meant to be enjoyed by all people regardless of any characteristic. The bicycle as a symbol of human progress and advancement "[promotes] tolerance, mutual understanding and respect and [facilitates] social inclusion and a culture of peace." The bicycle further is a "symbol of sustainable transport and conveys a positive message to foster sustainable consumption and production, and has a positive impact on climate."

World Bicycle Day is now being associated with promoting a healthy lifestyle for those with Type 1 and Type 2 diabetes.

See also 
 Bicycle Day (disambiguation)
 Cycling advocacy

References

External links 

 

United Nations days
Bicycles
Recurring events established in 2018